The 1975–76 Yorkshire Football League was the 50th season in the history of the Yorkshire Football League, a football competition in England.

Division One

Division One featured 12 clubs which competed in the previous season, along with four new clubs, promoted from Division Two:
Bridlington Town
Maltby Miners Welfare
Pickering Town
Redfearn National Glass

League table

Map

Division Two

Division Two featured eight clubs which competed in the previous season, along with eight new clubs.
Clubs relegated from Division One:
Denaby United
Guiseley
Yorkshire Amateur
Clubs promoted from Division Three:
Norton Woodseats
Selby Town
Stocksbridge Works
Tadcaster Albion

League table

Map

Division Three

Division Three featured ten clubs which competed in the previous season, along with six new clubs.
Clubs relegated from Division Two:
Ossett Town
Rawmarsh Welfare
Scarborough reserves
Plus:
Collingham
Dodworth Miners Welfare
Rossington Miners Welfare

League table

Map

League Cup

Final

References

1975–76 in English football leagues
Yorkshire Football League